V373 Scuti was a nova which appeared in 1975 in the southern constellation of Scutum.  It was announced on June 15, 1975 by Paul Wild at the Zimmerwald Observatory, Switzerland. At the time the magnitude was about 7.9. The peak magnitude of 7.1 occurred a month earlier on May 11.

The light curve of this nova declined as a typical power law following the peak, but showed significant jittery behavior. The large amplitude flickering as well as other indicators suggest a magnetic influence, making this a candidate intermediate polar system. A luminosity modulation of 258.3 seconds is most likely due to rotation of the white dwarf.

References

External links

Novae
Intermediate polars
Scutum (constellation)
1975 in science
Scuti, V373